Philip Schjetlein (born 12 January 1986) is a Norwegian jazz musician (guitar), known from self-titled bands like P. S. Quartet/Trio.

Career 
Schjetlein studied music on the Jazz program at Trondheim Musikkonsevatorium, NTNU (2009). Together with fellow students he initiated his own Philip Schjetlein Quartet/Trio, including Adrian Waade (violin, not in the trio), Fredrik Luhr Dietrichson (double bass) and Hans Hulbækmo (drums), performing with Studio Sokrates and program host Knut Borge, philosopher Elin Svenneby, and program host Lars Nilsen NRK. Together with Wade he also collaborates in the quartet Wade/Schjetlein/Sundland/Nørstebø.

References

External links 
Philip Schjetlein Trio on YouTube

1986 births
Musicians from Oslo
Living people
Norwegian jazz guitarists
Norwegian University of Science and Technology alumni
21st-century Norwegian guitarists